Luka Mirković (born 1 November 1990) is a Montenegrin international footballer who plays for Budućnost Podgorica, as a midfielder.

Club career
He has played club football for Lovćen, Mladost Podgorica and Budućnost Podgorica.

International career
Mirković made his debut for Montenegro in a May 2018 friendly match against Bosnia and has, as of September 2020, earned a total of 3 caps, scoring no goals.

References

External links
 

1990 births
Living people
Association football midfielders
Montenegrin footballers
Montenegro international footballers
FK Lovćen players
OFK Titograd players
FK Budućnost Podgorica players
Montenegrin First League players